In algebraic number theory, the Albert–Brauer–Hasse–Noether theorem states that a central simple algebra over an algebraic number field K which splits over every completion Kv is a matrix algebra over K. The theorem is an example of a local-global principle in algebraic number theory and 
leads to a complete description of finite-dimensional division algebras over algebraic number fields in terms of their local invariants. It was proved independently by Richard Brauer, Helmut Hasse, and Emmy Noether and by Abraham Adrian Albert.

Statement of the theorem 

Let A be a central simple algebra of rank d over an algebraic number field K. Suppose that for any valuation v, A splits over the corresponding local field Kv:

 

Then A is isomorphic to the matrix algebra Md(K).

Applications 

Using the theory of Brauer group, one shows that two central simple algebras A and B over an algebraic number field K are isomorphic over K if and only if their completions Av and Bv are isomorphic over the completion Kv for every v.

Together with the Grunwald–Wang theorem, the Albert–Brauer–Hasse–Noether theorem implies that every central simple algebra over an algebraic number field is cyclic, i.e. can be obtained by an explicit construction from a cyclic field extension L/K .

See also 

 Class field theory
 Hasse norm theorem

References

 
 

 
 
 Revised version — 
 Albert, Nancy E. (2005), "A Cubed & His Algebra, iUniverse,

Notes 

Class field theory
Theorems in algebraic number theory